Gespenster is a 2005 German film directed by Christian Petzold. Petzold also cowrote the screenplay with Harun Farocki. The film was presented at the 2005 Berlin International Film Festival, where it was officially entered into competition.

Plot
The film portrays a day, a night and the following day in the life of a teenage orphan, Nina, who lives in a group home. Nina is shy, introverted and lives only in the past, which she tries to fabricate in her diary. She meets Toni, a young woman living on the street who is her exact opposite: she concerns herself only with surviving the present moment.

They meet Françoise, who has recently been released from a mental hospital in Berlin and now wanders the city aimlessly. Unable to give up the hope of finding her daughter, Marie, who was abducted many years ago, she is also arrested by the past. Françoise believes she recognizes Nina as her daughter. Her husband, Pierre, tries patiently to convince her to return with him to France.

When Nina is abandoned by Toni after a party she goes looking for the place where she had encountered Françoise. She hopes that she finally might have found a real mother. Although Françoise is there, at the film's end Nina is left bitterly disappointed.

Cast
 Julia Hummer - Nina:          
 Sabine Timoteo - Toni
 Marianne Basler - Françoise
 Aurélien Recoing - Pierre
 Benno Fürmann - Oliver
 Anna Schudt - Kai
  - Heimleiterin 
  - Mathias
 Victoria Trauttmansdorff - Mathias' Mutter

Awards
2005: Findling Award
2006: German Film Critics Association Award - Best Feature

External links 
  Offizieller Internetauftritt des Films
  
  Filmportal.de
  Roter Teppich und Pressekonferenz zum Film mit Christian Petzold, Julia Hummer, Sabine Timoteo und Aurélien Recoing, Berlinale-Archiv
 Interview mit Christian Petzold: „Mit geschlossenen Augen hören“, taz, 15. Februar 2005
 Interview mit Christian Petzold auf filmtext.com: „Mädchen im Schwebezustand“
 Jens Hinrichsen auf film-dienst: „Im Zwischenreich. Christian Petzolds Gespenster-Trilogie: Passagen in Schattenzonen deutscher Realität“
 Gespenster in Setsuled's Journal, 2012

German drama films
2000s German-language films
2000s French-language films
2005 films
2005 drama films
Films directed by Christian Petzold
French drama films
2000s French films
2000s German films